Robert Stevenson (born 10 May 1869) was a Scottish footballer, a versatile full and half back who could also play at centre forward. He was the first captain of Thames Ironworks, who were later reformed as West Ham United.

Career
Born in Barrhead, Scotland, Stevenson first played for Third Lanark in 1892–93, before joining Woolwich Arsenal in May 1894. He spent a single season with the Gunners, playing at half-back for the first seven Second Division matches of the 1894–95 season. Stevenson also briefly captained the club. In March 1895, Stevenson was allowed to join up with Old Castle Swifts, but they soon folded and he returned to Scotland.

On his return to England, Stevenson was called up to play for the newly established Thames Ironworks team for the 1895–96 season. His return to Hermit Road saw him instantly installed as their first ever club captain and went on to play for the Irons for a season and a half, covering full-back and centre-forward roles as well as his usual position of half-back.

The first season saw Stevenson score at least 8 goals in 20 games and gain a winner's medal in the West Ham Charity Cup. In February 1897, after 16 appearances and 5 goals in the Irons' second campaign of 1896-97, Stevenson left the club. He once again returned to Scotland and joined Arthurlie.

References

External links
Robert Stevenson at westhamstats.info

1869 births
Year of death missing
People from Barrhead
Scottish footballers
Association football wing halves
Third Lanark A.C. players
Arsenal F.C. players
Old Castle Swifts F.C. players
Thames Ironworks F.C. players
Arthurlie F.C. players
Sportspeople from East Renfrewshire
Scottish Football League players
English Football League players